The 1990 Brownlow Medal was the 63rd year the award was presented to the player adjudged the fairest and best player during the Australian Football League (AFL) home and away season. Tony Liberatore of the Footscray Football Club won the medal by polling eighteen votes during the 1990 AFL season.

The Count
The tiny rover had struggled to break into Footscray's senior team over the previous three seasons, started the year unsure of his place after being overlooked for a night game during the pre-season and contemplated nominating for the AFL Draft. Liberatore thus became the first VFL/AFL footballer to have won the League best and fairest award at three levels, having previously won the Morrish Medal (for the Under 19s competition) in 1984 and the Gardiner Medal twice (for the Reserves competition) in 1986 and 1988.

Upon accepting the award, Liberatore thanked the club president, Peter Gordon, for saving the club, coach Terry Wheeler for the opportunity to play and for believing in him, and thanked his parents and fiancée. He also spoke of how persistence and being given a chance had helped him cement his place in the team:

I always believed that anything you do in life, you persevere and give it all you got. ... Through the love of Footscray, I decided I would stick at it. ... It goes to show that playing at that level, sometimes when the young players get an opportunity, they really play well and that's what happened to me.

Top 10 votegetters 
If a number is vacant, it indicates that the player missed that particular game.
Numbers highlighted in blue indicates the player led/were equal leader in the Brownlow Medal count at the end of that round.
Players with asterisks next to names indicates ineligibility to win the award due to suspension from the Tribunal.

Leading votegetters by club

References

External links
 

Brownlow Medal
1990
1990 Australian Football League season